Willie Grimes may refer to:

Willie Grimes, student killed during the 1969 Greensboro uprising
Willie Grimes, a character in I Sell the Dead
Willie Grimes, a character in Squirm

See also
William Grimes (disambiguation)